Courting Alex is an American sitcom that aired on CBS from January 23 to March 29, 2006, and was a vehicle for Jenna Elfman of Dharma & Greg fame. The series was based on the British sitcom According to Bex.

Elfman portrays Alex Rose, a successful, single attorney who works with her father Bill (Dabney Coleman) at his law firm. Alex struggles with dating while looking for love in a big city. Her father wants her to settle down with her coworker Stephen (Josh Stamberg), a star lawyer at the firm who is smitten with her. She prefers Scott (Josh Randall), the tavern owner she meets in the first episode, of whom her father doesn't approve. Alex relies on the advice of her assistant Molly (Jillian Bach) and British neighbor Julian (Hugh Bonneville).

Comedian Wayne Federman had a recurring role as office sycophant, Johnson.

Cast
Jenna Elfman....Alex Rose
Dabney Coleman....Bill Rose
Hugh Bonneville....Juilan
Josh Randall....Scott
Josh Stamberg....Stephen
Jillian Bach....Molly

Show history
The show's working titles were Everything I Know about Men and The Jenna Elfman Show.  The stage for the office where Alex works is a redressed version of the Winfred-Louder Department Store set used by The Drew Carey Show.

Despite starting off with impressive numbers, ratings for Courting Alex fell hard after the show was moved to Wednesday nights. The show was not picked up for a second season in May 2006 when CBS canned Courting Alex and fellow freshman series Out of Practice.

The show's theme song was performed by Nikka Costa.

Episodes

Ratings
Based on the average total viewers per episode of Courting Alex on CBS:

Despite a decent respectable rating average that passed the 10 million meter mark the show was not renewed for a second season and was canceled mid-way into the season.

Broadcast
Starting July 24 Paramount Comedy 1 in the UK started airing Courting Alex  every Monday at 9pm in double bills.

In 2007 Talpa in the Netherlands started airing Courting Alex every Sunday.

For Thailand, Courting Alex was airing on True Series (True Visions).

In Serbia, Courting Alex was airing weeknights at 8pm on TV Avala.

In Croatia, Courting Alex or Sve sto znam o muškarcima was airing weeknights at 1pm on Nova TV.

In the UK, Courting Alex was airing weekdays at 9am on Paramount Comedy 1 from May 28, 2007.

In Turkey, Courting Alex will be airing Monday, Wednesday and Friday from Sept 26 2007.

In Australia, Courting Alex is currently aired on Channel Ten at midnight on Tuesdays.

In Poland the show called simply Alex  is frequently rerun on Comedy Central Poland and recently (June 2008) started on POLSAT TV on weekdays' mornings.

References

External links
 

2000s American sitcoms
2006 American television series debuts
2006 American television series endings
2000s American legal television series
CBS original programming
English-language television shows
American television series based on British television series
Television series by ABC Studios
Television series by CBS Studios
Television shows set in New York City